Muwafaq Hussein is a former Iraqi football midfielder who played for Iraq.

Muwafaq played for the national team in 1986 . He coached Iraq at the 2013 FIFA U-17 World Cup.

References

Living people
Iraqi footballers
Iraq international footballers
Al-Shorta SC players
Al-Shorta SC managers
Association football midfielders
Iraqi football managers
Year of birth missing (living people)